Sæmingr was a king of Norway according to Snorri Sturluson's euhemerized accounts or Hålogaland. He was said to be the son of Odin or Yngvi-Freyr.

According to the prologue of the Prose Edda, Sæmingr was one of the sons of Odin and the ancestor of the kings of Norway and of the jarls of Hlaðir. Snorri relates that Odin settled in Sweden and:

After that he went into the north, until he was stopped by the sea, which men thought lay around all the lands of the earth; and there he set his son over this kingdom, which is now called Norway. This king was Sæmingr; the kings of Norway trace their lineage from him, and so do also the jarls and the other mighty men, as is said in the Háleygjatal.

—Prologue of the Prose Edda (11) Brodeur's translation

In the Ynglinga saga, Snorri adds that Sæmingr's mother was Skaði:

Njord took a wife called Skade; but she would not live with him and married afterwards Odin, and had many sons by him, of whom one was called Saeming; and about him Eyvind Skaldaspiller sings thus: --

"To Asa's son Queen Skade bore
Saeming, who dyed his shield in gore, --
The giant-queen of rock and snow,
Who loves to dwell on earth below,
The iron pine-tree's daughter, she
Sprung from the rocks that rib the sea,
To Odin bore full many a son,
Heroes of many a battle won."

To Saeming Earl Hakon the Great reckoned back his pedigree.

—The Ynglinga Saga (9), Laing's translation

Sæmingr is also listed among the sons of Odin in the þulur.

But in the prologue of the Heimskringla Snorri mentions that according to a lost stanza of Eyvindr skáldaspillir's Háleygjatal, Sæmingr was the son of Yngvi-Freyr.

The late Saga of Hálfdan Eysteinsson also reports that Sæmingr was Odin's son. The saga adds that he reigned over Hålogaland. He married Nauma and had a son called Þrándr.

A Swedish king by the name Semingr (likely the very same name as the Norwegian king of Folklore in an alternate rendering) becomes victim to a draugr who wields a legendary sword in The Saga of Hromund Gripsson. A similar name, "Sámr", appears related to characters in both Hrafnkels saga & Njáls saga.

Notes

References

 Brodeur, Arthur Gilchrist (trans.). 1916. Snorri Sturluson: The Prose Edda. New York: The American-Scandinavian Foundation.
 Laing, Samuel (trans.), Anderson, Rasmus B. (rev., notes). 1907. Snorre Sturlason: The Heimskringla: a history of the Norse kings. London: Norrœna society. First published: 1844.

Sons of Odin
Kings in Norse mythology and legends